Bishop Hodges Higher Secondary School', is under C.S.I. Madhya Kerala Diocese in Alleppey District. The school is located at the heart of Mavelikara town (near to Kayamkulam-Thiruvalla highway).

History
The institution is founded in the year 1839 as a high school. The school was upgraded to higher secondary in 1998.
The school has classes from 5th standard to 12th standard

Curriculum
The school follows Kerala State Syllabus of Education (SCERT) for classes from 5th to 10th.
 Medium of teaching is both Malayalam and English

Higher Secondary
For Higher Secondary following courses are offered under Higher Secondary Board syllabus.
Science - Biology Stream -Physics, Chemistry, Botany, Zoology and Mathematics
Science -Computer Science stream -Physics, Chemistry, Computer Science and Maths
Science - Electronics stream - Physics, Chemistry, Electronics and Mathematics
Commerce
Humanities
Second languages offered are ((Hindi)) & ((Malayalam))

Buildings
The school has five separate blocks of buildings for each sections.(Upper Primary, High School, Higher Secondary)

Physical activity grounds
The school has a basketball court, volleyball court, cricket ground in its premises.

Noted Alumni
P. C. Alexander
 Air Commodore George Verghis, AVSM

References

See also
Church of South India
SSLC
Secondary School
Education in India

Church of South India schools
Christian schools in Kerala
High schools and secondary schools in Kerala
Schools in Alappuzha district
Educational institutions established in 1839
1839 establishments in India